Vêtre-sur-Anzon is a commune in the Loire department in central France. It was established on 1 January 2019 by merger of the former communes of Saint-Julien-la-Vêtre (the seat) and Saint-Thurin.

See also
Communes of the Loire department

References

Communes of Loire (department)